Barkhala  is a village of Nalbari district in Western Assam under 11 No Deharkuchi Gram Panchayat of Borigog Banbhag Development Block.

Language 
The primary language used in Barkhala is Kamrupi, as in Nalbari district and Kamrup region

Education
There is a Sanskrit Tol in Barkhala named Jogeswrei Darshan Vidyalaya.

See also
 Villages of Nalbari District

References

External links
 

Villages in Nalbari district